Sven Günther Rothenberger (born 1 June 1966 in Frankfurt am Main) is an equestrian from Germany, who competed for the Netherlands after his marriage with Dutch equestrian Gonnelien Gordijn.

Sven is the father of Sonke Rothenberger, who won team gold at the 2016 Rio de Janeiro Olympics.

References

External links
 Dutch Olympic Committee

1966 births
Living people
Dutch dressage riders
Olympic equestrians of the Netherlands
Dutch male equestrians
Equestrians at the 1996 Summer Olympics
Equestrians at the 2004 Summer Olympics
Olympic silver medalists for the Netherlands
Olympic bronze medalists for the Netherlands
Olympic medalists in equestrian
Sportspeople from Frankfurt
Medalists at the 1996 Summer Olympics